Lavij Rural District is a rural district (dehestan) in Chamestan District, Nur County, Mazandaran Province, Iran. At the 2006 census, its population was 3,229, in 741 families. The rural district has 15 villages.

References 

Rural Districts of Mazandaran Province
Nur County